Brad Goss in an American college baseball coach and former catcher. He played college baseball at Arkansas Tech University. Goss served as the interim head baseball coach at the University of Tennessee at Martin during the 2014 season.

Goss played baseball at Arkansas Tech, where he continues to appear in record books in many offensive categories.  He became a graduate assistant and volunteer assistant coach at UT Martin, and was later named the first ever full-time assistant coach of the Skyhawks.  After Bubba Cates was relieved of duties, Goss was named interim coach for the 2014 season.  The program finished 9–42 during the season, after which Rick Robinson was hired as the head coach.

Head coaching record
The following is a table of Goss's yearly records as an NCAA head coach.

References

Living people
People from Pope County, Arkansas
People from Russellville, Arkansas
Arkansas Tech Wonder Boys baseball players
UT Martin Skyhawks baseball coaches
Year of birth missing (living people)